The 50th British Academy Film Awards, given by the British Academy of Film and Television Arts on 29 April 1997, honoured the best films of 1996.

Anthony Minghella's The English Patient won for Best Film (and previously won the Academy Award for Best Picture), while Mike Leigh's Secrets & Lies was voted Outstanding British Film. Geoffrey Rush won for Best Actor in a Leading Role for his role in Shine and Brenda Blethyn won for Best Actress in a Leading Role for her role in Secrets & Lies, respectively.

Winners and nominees

Statistics

See also
 69th Academy Awards
 22nd César Awards
 2nd Critics' Choice Awards
 49th Directors Guild of America Awards
 10th European Film Awards
 54th Golden Globe Awards
 8th Golden Laurel Awards
 17th Golden Raspberry Awards
 1st Golden Satellite Awards
 11th Goya Awards
 12th Independent Spirit Awards
 2nd Lumières Awards
 23rd Saturn Awards
 3rd Screen Actors Guild Awards
 49th Writers Guild of America Awards

References

Film050
1996 film awards
1997 in British cinema
April 1997 events in the United Kingdom
1997 in London
1996 awards in the United Kingdom